New City Initiative NCI is a think tank that offers an independent, expert voice in the debate over the future of financial regulation.

Founded in 2010, NCI counts amongst its members some of the leading independent asset management firms in the City and the continent. The NCI gives a voice to independent, owner-managed firms that are entirely focused on and aligned with the interests of their clients and investors.

Over the last decade, an old fashioned “client-centric” approach has enabled entrepreneurial firms in the Square Mile and beyond to emerge as a growing force in a financial industry dominated by global financial giants. Now, more so than ever, these firms play a key role in preserving the stability and long-term focus of the financial sector, which is of benefit to society at large.

The NCI aims to raise awareness of the contribution made by small entrepreneurial firms make to the economy and society as a whole. It publishes quarterly papers and contributes evidence to relevant political and regulatory commissions. It has recently argued that the bonus cap for bankers should only apply to banks that were bailed out by taxpayers and should not apply to independent fund managers.

Members

UK Members 

 Bentley Reid & Co
 Brown Advisory
 Cape Ann Asset Management
 Cologny Advisors LLP
 Crux Asset Management
 Dalton Strategic Partnership LLP
 Edgbaston Investment Partners
 Findlay Park Partners LLP
 Floreat Group
 Independent Franchise Partners LLP
 Kennox Asset Management Limited
 Kestrel Investment Partners
 Kiltearn Partners
 Latitude Investment Management
 Longview Partners LLP
 Majedie Asset Management Ltd
 Mayfair Capital Investment Management Ltd
 Montanaro Asset Management
 Morant Wright Management Ltd
 Neptune Investment Management
 Northill Capital LLP
 NS Partners Ltd.
 Ocean Dial Asset Management Limited
 Oldfield Partners LLP
 Orbis Investments
 Phoenix Asset Management Partners Limited
 Polar Capital
 RWC Partners Ltd.
 Sanderson Asset Management
 Sanlam Four Investments Ltd
 Seaforth Land Holding Limited
 Silchester International Investors
 Somerset Capital Management LLP
 Stanhope Capital LLP
 Stonehage Fleming Family & Partners
 S. W. Mitchell Capital LLP
 Tellsons Investors LLP
 Troy Asset Management Limited
 ValuAnalysis Limited
 Vestra Wealth LLP
 Waverton Investment Management

Continental Members 

 Carmignac Gestion
 Comgest S.A.
 La Financière Responsable
 Mandarine Gestion
 Sycomore Asset Management
 Skagen Funds
 Quaero Capital

References

External links
 The Guardian
 Standard

Think tanks based in the United Kingdom